Albert Brülls (26 March 1937 – 28 March 2004) was a German footballer who played 25 times for the West Germany national team, including matches in both the 1962 and 1966 FIFA World Cups.

Domestically he played for and was also captain of Borussia Mönchengladbach between 1955 and 1962. During this time he led the side to their first sporting achievement in 1960, when Borussia won the DFB Cup by defeating their archrivals 1. FC Köln 3–1. He then went on to become one of the first Germans to play for a club side outside West Germany, transferring to the Italian team FC Modena for a fee of 100,000 marks.

References

External links
 
 

1937 births
2004 deaths
People from Viersen (district)
Sportspeople from Düsseldorf (region)
German footballers
Association football midfielders
Germany international footballers
Borussia Mönchengladbach players
Brescia Calcio players
Modena F.C. players
Serie A players
Serie B players
BSC Young Boys players
Footballers at the 1956 Summer Olympics
Olympic footballers of the United Team of Germany
1962 FIFA World Cup players
1966 FIFA World Cup players
German football managers
BSC Young Boys managers
Footballers from North Rhine-Westphalia
West German expatriate footballers
West German expatriate sportspeople in Italy
Expatriate footballers in Italy
West German expatriate sportspeople in Switzerland
Expatriate footballers in Switzerland
West German footballers